Denis Reul (born 29 June 1989) is a German professional ice hockey player who is currently playing for Adler Mannheim in the Deutsche Eishockey Liga (DEL).

Playing career
Reul was selected by the Boston Bruins in the 5th round (130th overall) of the 2007 NHL Entry Draft after playing with Mannheim in the lower German divisions. After he was selected by the Bruins, Reul moved to North America and played junior with Lewiston MAINEiacs of the Quebec Major Junior Hockey League.

After completing his second season with the MAINEiacs in 2008–09, Reul then joined the Bruins American Hockey League affiliate, the Providence Bruins on an amateur try-out. Without a contract offer from Boston, Reul returned to Germany and signed with Adler Mannheim of the DEL on 10 July 2009.

On 26 October 2010, Reul extended his contract for another two-years with Adler Mannheim.

Career statistics

Regular season and playoffs

International

Awards and honours

References

External links
 

1989 births
Adler Mannheim players
Boston Bruins draft picks
German ice hockey defencemen
Lewiston Maineiacs players
Living people
Providence Bruins players
People from Wunsiedel (district)
Sportspeople from Upper Franconia